Enoch Beery Seitz (24 August 1846 in Fairfield County, Ohio – 8 October 1883 in Adair, Missouri) was an American mathematician who was Chair of Mathematics at North Missouri State Normal School).  

Seitz was elected to the London Mathematical Society on 11 March 1880, only the fifth American to be so honored.  Over 500 of his solutions were published in the Analyst, the Mathematical Visitor, the Mathematical Magazine, the School Visitor and the Educational Times of London, England.

References

External links
Enoch Beery Seitz

19th-century American mathematicians
1846 births
1883 deaths
Mathematicians from Missouri